Glyptocarcinus is a genus of crabs in the family Xanthidae, containing the following species:

 Glyptocarcinus lophopus Takeda, 1973
 Glyptocarcinus politus Ng & Chia, 1994

References

Xanthoidea